The 2004 Sylvania 300 was a NASCAR Nextel Cup Series race held on September 19, 2004 at New Hampshire International Speedway, in Loudon, New Hampshire. Contested at 300 laps on the speedway, it was the 27th race of the 2004 NASCAR Nextel Cup Series season. Kurt Busch of Roush Racing won the race.

Background
New Hampshire International Speedway is a  oval speedway located in Loudon, New Hampshire which has hosted NASCAR racing annually since the early 1990s, as well as an IndyCar weekend and the oldest motorcycle race in North America, the Loudon Classic.  Nicknamed "The Magic Mile", the speedway is often converted into a  road course, which includes much of the oval. The track was originally the site of Bryar Motorsports Park before being purchased and redeveloped by Bob Bahre. The track is currently one of eight major NASCAR tracks owned and operated by Speedway Motorsports.

Summary
The 2004 Sylvania 300 was the first time drivers raced in the Chase for the Nextel Cup format. Rain cancelled qualifying, prompting the grid to be set from owner's points. Jeff Gordon led them down to the green flag. Afterward, Greg Biffle got in the back of Robby Gordon sending Gordon spinning. Later in the race Robby Gordon spun Biffle collecting Chase contenders Tony Stewart and Jeremy Mayfield. Robby Gordon was penalized two laps for aggressive driving. Kurt Busch won the race to start his run toward his first Nextel Cup Series championship.

Top 10 results

Race Statistics
 Time of race: 2:53:31
 Average Speed: 
 Pole Speed: no time trials
 Cautions: 7 for 30 laps
 Margin of Victory: 2.488 sec
 Lead changes: 15
 Percent of race run under caution: 10%         
 Average green flag run: 33.8 laps

References

Sylvania 300
Sylvania 300
NASCAR races at New Hampshire Motor Speedway